Reginald Crawford may refer to:

Reginald Crawford (died 1307), Scottish knight
Reginald Crawford (cricketer) (1882–1945)

See also
 Barns of Ayr
 Clan Crawford
 Crawford (surname)